Thomas Donald Caven (May 21, 1871 – February 20, 1926) was a Canadian politician and railway employee. He was a member of the Legislative Assembly of British Columbia from 1909 to 1916, representing Cranbrook.

Caven was born in 1871 in Ontario to John Caven and Adelia Bougard. He came to Cranbrook around 1898 upon the completion of the Crowsnest Pass line of the Canadian Pacific Railway.

Caven was an employee of the Canadian Pacific Railway, a longtime railway conductor. A 1903 article stated that his property interests were largely a part of his money earned as a railway employee, noting that he "[represented] the people that have made Cranbrook one of the flourishing and progressive towns of the province." In the 1903 British Columbia general election, he obtained the Conservative nomination for the provincial electoral district of Cranbrook, but he would ultimately lose out to Liberal James Horace King. After another defeat in 1907, Caven would eventually head to the Legislative Assembly of British Columbia, elected in 1909 and again, this time by acclamation in 1912. His term ended in 1916 when he was defeated again by James H. King. He attempted a return in 1920 as an Independent Conservative but he was defeated by King once again. He retired from the railway in 1923.

In November 1906, Caven married Elizabeth Dickerson of Emporium, Pennsylvania. He was an active member of the freemasons, taking part in the Cranbrook Masonic Lodge, Royal Arch Masons and Seklirk Preceptory. Thomas Caven died suddenly February 20, 1926 at Vancouver. A newspaper report noted the "profound shock" that his death sent across the East Kootenay region, as it was not known that he was in ill health at the time.

Electoral history

|Liberal
|James Horace King
|align="right"|500 	 	
|align="right"|53.48%
|align="right"|
|align="right"|unknown
|- style="background:white;"
! style="text-align:right;" colspan="3"|Total valid votes
!align="right"|935 	
!align="right"|100.00%
!align="right"|
|- style="background:white;"
! style="text-align:right;" colspan="3"|Total rejected ballots
!align="right"|
!align="right"|
!align="right"|
|- style="background:white;"
! style="text-align:right;" colspan="3"|Turnout
!align="right"|%
!align="right"|
!align="right"|
|}
 

|Liberal
|Malcolm Archibald MacDonald
|align="right"|501 	  	 	
|align="right"|35.66%
|align="right"|
|align="right"|unknown
|- style="background:white;"
! style="text-align:right;" colspan="3"|Total valid votes
!align="right"|1,405 
!align="right"|100.00%
!align="right"|
|- style="background:white;"
! style="text-align:right;" colspan="3"|Total rejected ballots
!align="right"|
!align="right"|
!align="right"|
|- style="background:white;"
! style="text-align:right;" colspan="3"|Turnout
!align="right"|%
!align="right"|
!align="right"|
|}

|- style="background:white;"
! style="text-align:right;" colspan="3"|Total valid votes
!align="right"|n/a
!align="right"| -.-%
!align="right"|
|- style="background:white;"
! style="text-align:right;" colspan="3"|Total rejected ballots
!align="right"|
!align="right"|
!align="right"|
|- style="background:white;"
! style="text-align:right;" colspan="3"|Turnout
!align="right"|%
!align="right"|
!align="right"|
|}	
  	  	  	  	    	  	  	 

|Liberal
|James Horace King
|align="right"|727 	 	 	
|align="right"|59.06%
|align="right"|
|align="right"|unknown
|- style="background:white;"
! style="text-align:right;" colspan="3"|Total valid votes
!align="right"|1,231 	 	
!align="right"|100.00%
!align="right"|
|- style="background:white;"
! style="text-align:right;" colspan="3"|Total rejected ballots
!align="right"|
!align="right"|
!align="right"|
|- style="background:white;"
! style="text-align:right;" colspan="3"|Turnout
!align="right"|%
!align="right"|
!align="right"|
|}

|Liberal
|James Horace King
|align="right"|941 		 	 	
|align="right"|50.98%
|- style="background:white;"
! style="text-align:right;" colspan="3"|Total valid votes
!align="right"|1,846	
!align="right"|100.00%

References

1871 births
1926 deaths